Petros Passalis (Greek: Πέτρος Πασσαλής) is a Greek former professional footballer who played as a defensive midfielder. He started his career at Edessaikos and transferred as a great talent at Olympiakos in 1994 where he starred for some years before joining Aris FC in 2001. He retired in 2007.

Honours

Club
Olympiacos
Greek Championship:  1997, 1998, 1999, 2000, 2001
Greek Cup: 1999
Edessaikos
Balkans Cup: 1993

References

1974 births
Living people
Greek footballers
Olympiacos F.C. players
Aris Thessaloniki F.C. players
Edessaikos F.C. players
Association football midfielders
Footballers from Giannitsa